Svea Sofia Monica Säker-Wetterström is a former wheelchair athlete from Sweden. She competed at the 1992 Summer Paralympics and medalled in all four of her events, taking silvers in the 100, 200, and 1500 metre races and a bronze in the 400 metres. Following a brief period of retirement from the sport, Wetterstrom was a late entry to the 1997 London Marathon. She was the surprise winner that year, besting the reigning champion Tanni Grey and setting a new course record of 1:49:09. She would go on to win the London Marathon again in 1999.

Säker-Wetterström had also competed in 800m wheelchair race at the 1984, 1988, 1992 and 1996 Summer Olympics. Her highest achievement was finishing at second place at the 1984 Olympics.

References

 Results at the Swedish Sports Organization for the Disabled

External links
 

1956 births
Living people
People from Gävle
Swedish wheelchair racers
Paralympic athletes of Sweden
Athletes (track and field) at the 1992 Summer Paralympics
Paralympic silver medalists for Sweden
Paralympic bronze medalists for Sweden
Wheelchair racers at the 1984 Summer Olympics
Wheelchair racers at the 1988 Summer Olympics
Wheelchair racers at the 1992 Summer Olympics
Wheelchair racers at the 1996 Summer Olympics
Female wheelchair racers
Paralympic wheelchair racers
Medalists at the 1992 Summer Paralympics
Paralympic medalists in athletics (track and field)
20th-century Swedish women